Jean-Philippe Duval (born 1968) is a Canadian film and television director from Quebec City, Quebec. He is most noted for his 1999 films Matroni and Me (Matroni et moi), for which he received Jutra Award nominations for Best Director and Best Screenplay at the 2nd Jutra Awards, and a Genie Award nomination for Best Adapted Screenplay at the 20th Genie Awards, and his 2009 film Through the Mist (Dédé, à travers les brumes), which received Jutra nominations for both Best Director and Best Screenplay at the 12th Jutra Awards.

At the 2nd Jutra Awards, his documentary film Lumière des oiseaux was also a nominee for Best Documentary Film.

His 2019 film 14 Days, 12 Nights (14 jours 12 nuits) was selected as the Canadian entry for the Best International Feature Film at the 93rd Academy Awards.

Filmography

Films
La nuit tous les chats sont gris - 1990
Soho - 1994
Matroni and Me (Matroni et moi) - 1999
Through the Mist (Dédé, à travers les brumes) - 2009
Wild Run: The Legend (Chasse-Galerie: La Légende) - 2016
9 (9, le film) - 2016
14 Days, 12 Nights (14 jours 12 nuits) - 2019

Documentary
 La Vie a du charme - 1993
 L'Odyssée baroque - 1994
 Lumière des oiseaux - 1999
 Marie, mère des apparitions - 2001
 WOW II - 2001
 Les Réfugiés de la planète bleue - 2006
 Au Québec avec Tintin - 2015

Television
 L'École de danse - 2002
 Marché Jean-Talon - 2003
 États-humains - 2004-07
 Martin sur la route - 2007
 Unité 9 - 2012

References

External links

1968 births
20th-century Canadian screenwriters
20th-century Canadian male writers
21st-century Canadian screenwriters
21st-century Canadian male writers
Canadian male screenwriters
Canadian screenwriters in French
Film directors from Quebec
Writers from Quebec City
Living people
Canadian television directors
Canadian documentary film directors